= Health and Education for All =

Charity operating in India

HEAL
- Health and Education for All
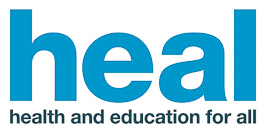
- HEAL logo
- Abbreviation: HEAL
- Formation: 1992
- Founder: Dr. Koneru Satya Prasad
- Founded at: UK
- Type: Non profit
- Headquarters: UK
- Region served: Andhra Pradesh, India
- Services: Health; Education; Social Development Programs
- Website: healcharity.org

Health and Education for All (HEAL) is a UK registered charity not for profit organisation operating in India. In UK, the activities of this non-profit are fundraising, increasing awareness on health and education aspects, while its associated body in India, HEAL India, works towards providing health, education, home and support for disadvantaged children in India.

== History ==
In 1992, Dr. Koneru Satya Prasad, the founder trustee of HEAL after moving to UK decided to turn his ancestral home back in India into an orphanage. The orphanage housed 26 children. HEAL was registered as a charity in UK. HEAL India was established in 1993 to increase charity activities in India. With an aim to promote overall growth, health and education of underprivileged and orphan children a residential campus was constructed in 1999 and now it houses about 225 orphan children. In order to increase charity campaign, HEAL charity campaigns were registered as HEAL USA in 2008, HEAL Australia in 2014 and HEAL Spain in 2015. HEAL Paradise school is funded by The Hans Foundation and provides free education, shelter and healthcare for 1000 street children in Guntur.

The Higher Education Academy for Learning, Alekhya AI Heal Centre of Excellence and a proposed Deemed University of HEAL Charity, a non-profit organization in Krishna district of Andhra Pradesh, was set up to provide free quality education and healthcare to the underprivileged.
